Matthew Pistilli (born October 17, 1988) is a Canadian professional ice hockey player who is currently playing for Löwen Frankfurt in the German DEL2.

Playing career
Undrafted from the Quebec Major Junior Hockey League, on May 20, 2009, he was signed as a free agent by the Carolina Hurricanes to a three-year entry-level contract.

After spending three years within the Hurricanes organizational affiliate's, Pistilli was signed without an extension to a one-year ECHL contract with the South Carolina Stingrays on September 21, 2012. During the 2012–13 season, Pistilli compiled 23 points in 35 games for the Stingrays before he was traded back to the Everblades as part of a deal for Matt Beca on December 31, 2012.

On September 8, 2014, Pistilli moved to his third ECHL club, in agreeing to a standard player contract with the Fort Wayne Komets. After a bright start to the 2014–15 season with the Komets, producing 13 points in 12 games, Pistilli returned to the AHL in signing a professional try-out contract with the Norfolk Admirals on November 17, 2014.

On July 15, 2015, with the Komets unable to match interest abroad, Pistilli agreed to a one-year contract with Danish club, Esbjerg Energy of the Metal Ligaen. He was a key part of Esbjerg's championship-winning campaign, playing 45 times in the regular season, tallying 22 goals and 40 assists, and recording five goals as well as eleven assists in 19 playoff contests on the way to the title.

Pistilli moved to Germany for the 2016-17 season, joining DEL2 side Löwen Frankfurt. He was the league's leading goal scorer in the 2016-17 regular season, tallying 32 goals in 51 contests.

Career statistics

Awards and honours
QMJHL Humanitarian of the Year (2008–09)
CHL Humanitarian of the Year (2008–09)

References

External links

1988 births
Albany River Rats players
Bridgeport Sound Tigers players
Charlotte Checkers (2010–) players
Florida Everblades players
Fort Wayne Komets players
Gatineau Olympiques players
Living people
Löwen Frankfurt players
Norfolk Admirals players
Shawinigan Cataractes players
South Carolina Stingrays players
Ice hockey people from Montreal
Canadian expatriate ice hockey players in Germany
Canadian ice hockey right wingers